The 2015 Parapan American Games, officially the V Parapan American Games and commonly known as the Toronto 2015 ParaPan-Am Games, were a major international multi-sport event for athletes with disabilities, celebrated in the tradition of the Parapan American Games as governed by the Americas Paralympic Committee, held from August 7 to 15, 2015 in Toronto, Ontario, Canada. Marking the first Parapan American games hosted by Canada, and the second major Paralympic sports event hosted by Toronto since the 1976 Summer Paralympics, the Games were held at venues in Toronto and four other Golden Horseshoe communities. Both the Parapan American and Pan American Games were organized by the Toronto 2015 Organizing Committee (TO2015).

The Games hosted 1,608 athletes representing 28 National Paralympic Committees (NPCs) in the Americas. 445 events were held in 15 sports—all of which serving as qualifiers for the 2016 Summer Paralympics, including the debut of wheelchair rugby at the Parapan American Games, and the return of 7-a-side football following its absence from the 2011 Parapan American Games.

Bidding process

The Canadian Olympic Committee chose Toronto and the surrounding region as the Canadian candidate. No other Canadian city was given a chance to bid in a domestic race, and thus Toronto was selected without a vote. Toronto's interest in bidding came after failing to land the 1996 Summer Olympics and the 2008 Summer Olympics, which were held in Atlanta and Beijing respectively.

On February 23, 2009, both Toronto City Council and Hamilton City Council approved the bid officially and confirmed their intentions to support the successful hosting of the event. The official bid book document was submitted to the Pan American Sports Organization (PASO) on May 27, 2009.

PASO made an evaluation visit to Toronto between August 30 and 31, 2009. The team analyzed the candidate city features and provided its feedback back to voting members of PASO. The evaluation committee was headed by Julio Maglione, a member of the IOC representing Uruguay and the head of Fédération Internationale de Natation (FINA), the international swimming federation. After the visit Maglione said, "Toronto has all the conditions to play host to the Pan American Games".

Toronto won the bidding process to host the Pan and Parapan American Games by a vote of the Pan American Sports Organization on November 6, 2009, at the PASO Session held in Guadalajara, Mexico. The result was announced by PASO President Mario Vázquez Raña. Toronto faced two other finalists shortlisted Lima, Peru, and Bogotá, Colombia. Toronto earned 33 votes, while contesting candidate cities Lima and Bogotá received 11 and 7 votes, respectively.

Development and preparation

Venues

Toronto became one of the most populous cities to ever hold the Parapan American Games. Toronto's summer temperatures around August are warm, and the city averages less than five days with the temperature going above . As well in August Toronto averages about 67mm of precipitation. Moreover, Toronto's elevation is at 112 m (367 ft) above sea level, which provides optimal and ideal conditions for athletes.

In January 2012, the organizing committee announced that sixty percent of the originally proposed venues would be dropped, in favour of a clustering system seen at other multi-sport events such as the 2012 Summer Olympics in London, Great Britain.

Athletes' living quarters were at the 2015 Pan American Games Athletes' Village.

The opening ceremonies was held at the CIBC Pan Am and Parapan Am Athletics Stadium and the closing ceremonies was held at Nathan Phillips Square. The Parapan Games re-used 12 venues from the Pan Am Games while one venue University of Toronto Scarborough Tennis Centre was newly constructed for the Parapan Am Games. Some of the competition venues in the Toronto area included the Pan American Field Hockey Centre, and the Toronto Pan Am Sports Centre. Only four competition venues were located outside of Toronto:

 Markham Pan Am Centre in Markham
 Mississauga Sports Centre in Mississauga
 Mattamy National Cycling Centre in Milton, Ontario 
 Abilities Centre in Whitby

Infrastructure and budget
The Toronto 2015 Organizing Committee (TO2015) along with all three levels of government spent about $1.4 billion Canadian dollars in upgrading and building new venues in the region. The provincial government (Ontario) and the Canadian federal government provided 35% each of the funding, with the municipalities covering the remaining 30% of the cost. Also $1 billion Canadian dollars was spent on building an athletes' village in the West Don Lands area of Toronto. Therefore, the total cost was $2.4 billion, the highest ever spent for a Pan/Parapan American Games. Later in 2011 Toronto's contribution to the games almost doubled from $49.5 million to $96.5 million for several reasons: the athletics stadium was moved to York University from Hamilton, the soil was to be remediated at the University of Toronto Scarborough where the proposed aquatics centre is supposed to be built, more money was needed for the proposed BMX track and the increase in inflation. $700 million Canadian dollars was spent to build and renovate infrastructure in the region, about three times what was spent for the 2011 Pan American Games.

Many transit improvements in Toronto were made in time for these games. These included the Union Pearson Express airport rail link.

Village
The Athlete's village cost $735 million CAD and had the capacity to hold up to 7,200 athletes and officials. After the games the village was converted to 746 market priced condos, 41 market-priced town homes, 250 affordable-rent apartments, 257 student dormitory units for George Brown College, office and retail units, and a YMCA recreation centre. The Athlete's Village was located in the West Don Lands along Front Street between Bayview Avenue and Cherry Street in Toronto. The development was certified LEED Gold.

Medals

In October 2013 it was announced that the medals for the games would be produced and designed by the Royal Canadian Mint. In September 2014 it was announced that the supplier of the raw minerals used in the medals (over 4,000 in total) would be Barrick Gold. All the materials used in the medals will come from the company's operations in the Americas region. The copper was mined at the company's Zaldivar mine in Chile, the silver at the Pueblo Viejo mine in the Dominican Republic and the gold was mined at the Hemlo mine in Northern Ontario.

The designs of the medals, created by artist Christi Belcourt were revealed on March 3, 2015 at a ceremony at the Royal Ontario Museum. Each of them are roughly 86.7 millimetres in diameter and weigh about 350 grams. The front of the medal featured three shapes representing three regions of the Americas: North America, Central America and the Caribbean, and South America. It also featured Braille for the first time. The back of the medal featured the logo and motto of the games and the elements of mokume-gane.

Volunteers
The organization committee expected 23,000 volunteers to be required for Pan Am and Parapan Am Games. Over 63,000 applicants applied to become a volunteer. A total of 6,688 volunteers participated as part of the Games.

Ticketing
Ticket sales began on March 25, 2015. More than 90,000 out of the 200,000 tickets available were sold.

Torch relay

The Parapan torch relay consisted of a 5-day journey, visiting 12 communities. Two torches were lit, one in the west at Niagara Falls and one in the east at Ottawa. Both make their way towards and reunite in Toronto.

Marketing

Mascot

Pachi was chosen as the Games mascot in 2013. The design was based on porcupine. Porcupines have relatively poor vision, so the choice of basing Pachi's design on a porcupine is said to be a symbolic bond with the athletes of the Parapan Games.

The Games

Ceremonies
The Opening Ceremony was held on August 7, 2015 at the CIBC Pan Am and Parapan Am Athletics Stadium, while the closing ceremony was held on 15 August 2015 at Nathan Phillips Square.

Opening ceremony
Before the ceremony began, the president of the Americas Paralympic Committee, Jose Luis Campo and Governor General David Johnston were introduced and entered the box of honour officially. This was followed by a countdown of number 20 to 0.

A rendition of Canada's national anthem was performed by Franco-Ontarian Gabrielle Goulet during the raising of the flag of the host country by the Royal Canadian Mounted Police and the Ontario Provincial Police and after that, a Lockheed C-130 Hercules of the Royal Canadian Air Force flew past over the stadium.

The ceremony began with an introductory performance called Migration of honour which represents the four elements of life: earth, water, wind and fire. It featured acrobatic dancers and performers from country’s four ancestral nations - The Mississaugas of the New Credit First Nation, the Huron-Wendat Nation, the Six Nations of the Grand River and the Métis Nation of Ontario. The performance was followed immediately by the Parade of Nations. Each teams marched into the stadium, preceded by a person carrying a circular placard written with the name of each participating team in the three languages (English, French and Spanish). The Canadian delegation entered last, representing the host nation. The remaining countries entered in English alphabetical order.

During the ceremony, Americas Paralympic Committee (APC) flag was carried into the stadium by Arnold Boldt, Tim McIsaac, Chelsey Gotell, Paul Rosen, Robert Hampson, David Shannon, Patrick Jarvis and Dr. Robert Steadward and raised to the Paralympic Anthem. Toronto 2015 chief executive Saäd Rafi and APC president Jose gave their speeches before Governor General David Johnston declare the games opened. Benoit Huot read the athletes’ oath, while cycling coach Sebastien Travers read the coaches oath. The ceremony featured dance and song performances produced by B5C Productions in a joint venture between local company BaAM Productions and American-based FiveCurrents, which symbolized unity through diversity. During the final torch relay, the flame was brought in by activist and athlete Rick Hansen and Canadian Broadcasting Corporation (CBC) program host Rick Mercer and passed to wheelchair racer Chantal Petitclerc who lit the cauldron. The ceremony concluded with Francesco Yates performing songs from debut album.

Parade of Nations

Closing ceremony
The ceremony began with the introduction of Toronto mayor and APC president Campo. The ceremony featured Sean Jones rendition of Canada's national anthem, the Franco-Ontarian urban folk band Le Group Swing, performances from Grammy award-winner Wyclef Jean, as well as country music singer-songwriter Meghan Patrick. That night, president of the Americas Paralympic Committee, Jose Luis Campo described the Games "the best Parapan American Games ever". After Saäd Rafi, chief executive officer and Campo gave their speeches, Campo declared the games closed and the Americas Paralympic Committee flag was lowered. Toronto Mayor John Tory passed the APC flag over to Lima Mayor Luis Castañeda Lossio through Campo. A cultural performance from Peru was presented to symbolize Peru as the host of the next edition. The flame was extinguished when spoken word artist Mustafa the Poet performed on stage. The ceremony concluded with fireworks released to the sky.

Participating nations
28 nations competed at the Games.

Number of athletes by National Paralympic Committee

Sports
Fifteen sports, the most ever for a Parapan American Games were contested. Wheelchair rugby made its debut at the Games, while Football 7-a-side made its return to the games after missing the 2011 Parapan American Games. All fifteen sports were used for Paralympic qualification in 2016.

Calendar

Medal table 
The final medal count.

See also
2015 Pan American Games

References

Further reading

Archival holdings 
Toronto 2015 Pan Am & Parapan American Games—Web archive collected by the University of Toronto Libraries

External links

 
 Closing ceremony of Toronto 2015 Parapan American Games

 
Parapan American Games
Parapan American Games
Parapan American Games
Multi-sport events in Canada
Parapan American Games
August 2015 sports events in Canada
International sports competitions in Toronto